NorthEast United FC is an Indian professional football club based in Guwahati, Assam that competes in the Indian Super League, the top flight of Indian football. The club was founded on 13 April 2014 during the inaugural season of Indian Super League. NorthEast United represent the 8 states of India known as North East India which consist Assam, Nagaland, Manipur, Meghalaya, Sikkim, Arunachal Pradesh, Tripura and Mizoram.

Team records

All time performance record
As of 2 September 2022

General 
Note: When scores are mentioned, score NorthEast United are given first.
First match: 1–0 (vs Kerala Blasters FC, 13 October 2014)
First Win: 1–0 (vs Kerala Blasters FC, 13 October 2014)
Biggest win (in ISL): 3–0 (vs Chennaiyin FC, 27 November 2014)
Biggest loss (in ISL): 
 0–5 (vs FC Pune City, 30 December 2017)
 0–5 (vs Hyderabad, 31 January 2022)
Highest scoring draw: 
 3–3 (vs Jamshedpur FC ,10 February 2020)
 3–3 (vs Chennaiyin FC ,18 February 2021)
 3–3 (vs Mumbai City , 27 December 2021)
Longest winning run: 3 games, during 2020-21 Indian Super League season
Longest unbeaten run: 11 games, during 2020-21 Indian Super League season
Longest losing run: 10 games, during 2022-23 Indian Super League season
First Win (in Super Cup): N/A
Biggest win (in Super Cup): N/A
Biggest loss (in Super Cup): 0–2 (vs Gokulam Kerala, 15 March 2018)
First Win (in Durand Cup): 2–0 (vs Sudeva Delhi, 2 September 2022)
Biggest win (in Durand Cup): 2–0 (vs Sudeva Delhi, 2 September 2022)
Biggest loss (in Durand Cup): 0–6 (vs Odisha, 17 August 2022)
Highest home attendance: 32,844 (vs Chennaiyin FC, 20 October 2016)
Lowest home attendance: 1,121 (vs Kerala Blasters FC, 17 February 2018)

Players Records

Appearances
Record appearance maker: 71 – Reagan Singh
Most appearances in Indian Super League: 69 – Reagan Singh
Most appearances in Super Cup: 2 –
Reagan Singh
Rowllin Borges
 Youngest player (also ISL record): Alfred Lalroutsang – 16 years 235 days
Youngest foreign player: Francis Dadzie – 20 years and 91 days
Oldest player: Silas – 39 years and 90 days 
Oldest Indian player: Subhasish Roy Chowdhury – 35 years and 136 days

All competitions 
As of match played 28 February 2022

Goals
All time top scorer: 12 –
 Bartholomew Ogbeche
 Deshorn Brown
First goalscorer:  Koke (vs Kerala Blasters, 13 October 2014)
First Indian goalscorer: Seiminlen Doungel (vs Chennaiyin, 8 November 2014)
Most goals in ISL: 12 –
 Bartholomew Ogbeche
 Deshorn Brown
Most goals in ISL by an Indian: 7 – V.P. Suhair
Most goals in an ISL season: 12 –  Bartholomew Ogbeche, (2018–2019 season)
Most goals in ISL season by an Indian: 4 – 
Seiminlen Doungel, (2017–2018 season)
Rowllin Borges, (2018–2019 season)
V.P. Suhair, (2021–2022 season)
Laldanmawia Ralte, (2021–22 season)
First goalscorer in Super Cup: Rowllin Borges (vs Chennaiyin, 2 April 2019)
Most goals in Super Cup: 1 – Rowllin Borges
First goalscorer in Durand Cup: Dipu Mirdha (vs Army Green, 21 August 2022)
Most goals in Durand Cup: 2 – Dipu Mirdha
Most goals in a match: 3
Seiminlen Doungel (vs Chennaiyin, 19 January 2018)
Bartholomew Ogbeche (vs Chennaiyin, 18 October 2018)
Deshorn Brown (vs Mumbai City, 27 December 2021)
First Hat trick: Seiminlen Doungel - (vs Chennaiyin on 19 January 2018)
Fastest hat-trick: 10 minutes – Bartholomew Ogbeche (vs Chennaiyin, 18 October 2018)
 Oldest goalscorer:  Silas (vs Chennaiyin,11 November 2015)
Youngest goalscorer:  Francis Dadzie  (vs FC Goa,15 October 2015)
Fastest goal: 1 min 42 seconds – V.P. Suhair (vs ATKMB, 21 December 2021)

Top goalscorers 
As of match played 18 February 2022

Club Hat-tricks

Assists
Most assists: 12 –  Federico Gallego
First assist:  Koke (vs Mumbai City, 24 October 2014)
Most assists in a season: 6 – Federico Gallego, during 2020–21 Indian Super League season

Most assists in ISL 
As of 28 February 2022 
(Players with their name in bold currently plays for the club.)

Clean sheets in ISL 
Most clean sheets: 13 – Rehenesh TP
First clean sheet: Alexandros Tzorvas (vs Kerala Blasters FC, 13 October 2014)
Most clean sheets in a season : 6 – Pawan Kumar, during 2018-19 Indian Super League season

Most clean sheets 
As of 2 September 2022
(Players with their name in bold currently plays for the club.)

Season Award Winners
 
Emerging Player
 
The following players have won the Indian Super League Emerging Player of the League award while playing for the NorthEast United:
 Lalengmawia - 2020–21

Managerial records 

Note: Interim managers and caretakers have been excluded from the list

As of 26 December 2022

Most Matches Managed:
 Eelco Schattorie –20
 Khalid Jamil –20
Least Matches Managed:
  Sérgio Farias –0
Most Wins:
  Eelco Schattorie –8
Most Defeats
  Khalid Jamil –12
Highest Win Percentage:
  César Farías –42.86%
Least Win Percentage:
  Avram Grant –0.00%
Most Matches As Assistant Manager:
  Alison Kharsyntiew –38

Coaches individual awards while coaching NorthEast United
 NorthEast United coaches that have won the FPAI Coach of the Year award :
 Khalid Jamil: (1) 2020–21

List of NorthEast United FC managers

See also 
 List of NorthEast United FC seasons

References

Records and statistics
NorthEast United FC